Węgornia  (Wãgòrniô) is a village in the administrative district of Gmina Łęczyce, within Wejherowo County, Pomeranian Voivodeship, in northern Poland.

For details of the history of the region, see History of Pomerania.

References

Villages in Wejherowo County